Pétange is a commune and town in south-western Luxembourg. It is part of the canton of Esch-sur-Alzette.  Pétange lies on the borders with both Belgium and France.

, the town of Pétange, which lies in the north of the commune, has a population of 7,399.  Other towns within the commune include Lamadelaine and Rodange.  The commune is one of the smallest communes of Luxembourg, yet is the fifth-most populous.  It is the most-populous commune without city status.

History
The modern settlement of Pétange was first mentioned in 938 by the name 'Perdgitten'.  Six centuries later, Pétange had still not acquired much prominence; in 1536, it was home to only about 25 people.

In 1601, the boundary between Luxembourg and the Duchy of Lorraine was definitively demarcated for the first time.  The modern commune was divided between the two, with the town of Pétange going to Luxembourg, but the towns of Rodange and Lamadelaine, which are further to the south, lying on the Lorrainian side of the border.

When, in 1795, Luxembourg was annexed into Revolutionary France as part of the département of Forêts, its former territories were reunited, and the commune's territory was established as it is today.  However, when Luxembourg passed to the United Kingdom of the Netherlands, after the Congress of Vienna, the towns of Rodange and Lamadelaine passed with it.

The town's importance grew greatly in the late nineteenth century, thanks to the booming iron-mining and steel industries.  The first railway into Pétange was opened in 1873, running to Esch-sur-Alzette.  Further railway lines were added to Ettelbruck (1873) and Luxembourg City (1900).

On 9 September 1944, Pétange became the first commune in the country to be liberated by Allied soldiers at the end of the German occupation in the Second World War.  In remembrance to the first soldier to die in the liberation, a memorial was erected in his honor: Hyman Josefson Square.

On August 9, 2019, a high-end F2 multiple-vortex tornado hit the town; this is a rare occurrence in Luxembourg. 19 people were injured, two seriously, and over 160 buildings were destroyed. The tornado reached windspeed between 200 and 250 km/h, suggesting F3 intensity. Many roofs were completely torn off, some of which landed on houses and vehicles. Large mast were also downed. The tornado traveled 14 km (8.6 miles) in total across a widespread area.

Geography
The commune lies in the extreme south-west of Luxembourg, bordering both the French département of Meurthe-et-Moselle and the Belgian province of Luxembourg.  The town of Rodange lies just across the border from the Belgian town of Aubange.  Pétange is situated at the west end of the Red Lands: iron-rich sedimentary rocks that form the far south and south-west of Luxembourg.  The town lies in the upper reaches of the Chiers valley, and is one of the few places in Luxembourg (along with the commune of Differdange) to lie outside the drainage system of the Rhine.

The commune is only  in area, one of the smallest in Luxembourg, but is the site of three significant towns.  The town of Pétange itself has a population of 6,909, but, despite being the seventh-largest town in Grand Duchy, accounts for under half of the population of the commune.  Rodange, in the south-west of the commune, is home to 4,505 people, whilst Lamadelaine, in the south of the commune, has a population of 2,335.

Population

Attractions
The south of the commune is home to Titelberg, a prominent hill on top of which lie the ruins of a Celtic oppidum. The entire settlement had a total population of 10,000 before the Roman conquest, making it the largest pre-Roman settlement in Luxembourg.

Pétange is the home of the Grand-Duchy's largest pre-Lenten Karneval celebration. Annually hosting a calvalacade with roughly 1200 participants and thousand of participants, the official name is Karneval Gemeng Péiteng or Kagepe (the initials in Luxembourgish are pronounced Ka, Ge and Pe).

The Fond de Gras heritage railway and museum recreate the conditions of the Red Lands in the year 1900, at the height of their growth and development.  Whilst the centre lies just within the commune of Differdange, to the east, the two steam locomotives take visitors to the towns of Pétange and Rodange, and provide a stream of tourists to the towns in the summer.

Pétange has a football team in Luxembourg's top-flight National Division, called Union Titus Pétange.  They play their home games at the Stade Municipal.  Despite being one of the oldest Luxembourgian clubs in existence, having been founded in 1910, Pétange have won only one trophy, the Luxembourg Cup in 2004–05.

Sports
 Union Titus Pétange - football club.

Prominent local people

 Chantelle de Rothschild - Crutchfield
 Louis-Phillip de Rothschild - Crutchfield
 Tessy de Nassau
 Jean-Marie Halsdorf

Twin towns — sister cities

Pétange is twinned with:
 Maribor, Slovenia
 Schiffweiler, Germany
 Schio, Italy

See also
 List of mayors of Pétange

References

External links

 Commune of Pétange official website

 
Communes in Esch-sur-Alzette (canton)
Towns in Luxembourg
Belgium–Luxembourg border crossings
France–Luxembourg border crossings